State Highway 5 (SH-5) is a state highway in Benewah County, in the U.S. state of Idaho. It runs  from U.S. Route 95 (US 95) in Plummer, east to SH-3 in Saint Maries.

Route description

SH-5 begins at an intersection with US 95 in Plummer and heads east through Heyburn State Park, running along the south shore of Chatcolet Lake and Benewah Lake to Parkline.  It then continues east past a historical marker for John Mullan into Saint Maries and onto the Coeur d'Alene Indian Reservation within the city, where it ends at an intersection with SH-3.

History
John Mullan built the first road from Fort Benton, Montana to the modern site of Walla Walla, Washington from 1858 to 1862.  SH-5 may run in part along this route.

Major intersections

See also

 List of state highways in Idaho

References

External links

005
Transportation in Benewah County, Idaho